The Wilson Handicap was an American Thoroughbred horse race run from 1930 through 1958. Inaugurated as the Wilson Stakes at the Saratoga Race Course in Saratoga Springs, New York, it was named in honor of the late Richard Thornton Wilson Jr., a prominent Thoroughbred owner and president of Saratoga Race Course.

Historical notes
The first running took place on August 2, 1930 and was contested at a distance of one mile (8 furlongs). It was won by the Glen Riddle Farm colt Battleship Gray who owned his sire, the legendary Man o' War.

Due to government wartime restrictions, the 1943 to 1945 runnings of the Wilson Stakes took place at Belmont Park. In July 1954, the race was shifted permanently to Jamaica Racetrack in Jamaica, New York where it was renamed the Wilson Handicap and run as a six furlong sprint. The event remained at the Jamaica track through 1958 and was then canceled due to the closure of the Jamaica facility on August 1, 1959.

In 1946 the future Hall of Fame filly Gallorette ran second in the Wilson Stakes but came back the next year to win the August 4, 1947 edition in a Saratoga track record time of 1:35 2/5 for the mile on dirt. In 1948 Gallorette returned to compete and her second straight Wilson Stakes.

The final running of the Wilson was held on July 29, 1958 and was won by Nahodah, a Marion duPont Scott homebred gelding.

Seven horses that won the Wilson Stakes, Devil Diver, Discovery, Eight Thirty, Equipoise, Gallorette, Tom Fool, War Admiral, all went on to have racing careers that would earn them induction into the U.S. Racing Hall of Fame.

Records
Speed record:
 1:10.40 @ 6 furlongs : Nahodah (1950)
 1:35.40 @ 1 mile (8 furlongs) : Gallorette (1947)

Most wins:
  2 - Equipoise (1932, 1933)
  2 - Discovery (1935, 1936)
  2 - Eight Thirty (1939, 1940)
  2 - Gallorette (1947, 1948)
  2 - Tom Fool (1952, 1953)

Most wins by a jockey:
 5 - Ted Atkinson (1944, 1951, 1952, 1953, 1954)

Most wins by a trainer:
 6 - John M. Gaver Sr. (1943, 1944, 1950, 1951, 1952, 1953)

Most wins by an owner:
 6 - Greentree Stable (1943, 1944, 1950, 1951, 1952, 1953)

Winners

References

Discontinued horse races in New York (state)
Saratoga Race Course
Belmont Park
Jamaica Race Course
Recurring sporting events established in 1930
Recurring sporting events disestablished in 1958
1930 establishments in New York (state)
1958 disestablishments in New York (state)